Karsang-e Shahi Jan (also Romanized as Kārsang-e Shāhī Jān; also known as Kārsang) is a village in Pir Kuh Rural District, Deylaman District, Siahkal County, Gilan Province, Iran. At the 2006 census, its population was 99, in 24 families.

References 

Populated places in Siahkal County